Yoni Wolf (formerly known by his stage name Why?) is an American alternative hip hop and indie rock artist based in Berkeley, California.  His discography consists of twelve studio albums, eight EPs, three compilations of demos, one compilation album, four live albums, numerous physical singles, and many production and remix credits and guest appearances on other artists' tracks.

Albums

Solo 
 Part Time People Cage... or Part Time Key? (1999) (as Why?)
 Oaklandazulasylum (2003) (as Why?)

Why? 
Elephant Eyelash (2005)
Alopecia (2008)
Eskimo Snow (2009)
Mumps, Etc. (2012)
Moh Lhean (2017)
AOKOHIO (2019)

Clouddead (Yoni Wolf with Doseone & Odd Nosdam) 
 Clouddead (2001)
 Ten (2004)

Greenthink (Yoni Wolf with Doseone) 
 It's Not Easy Being... (1998)
 Blindfold (1999)

Other collaborations 
 Object Beings (2001) (with Doseone & Pedestrian, as Object Beings)
 In the Shadow of the Living Room (2002) (with Odd Nosdam, as Reaching Quiet)
 Hymie's Basement (2003) (with Andrew Broder, as Hymie's Basement)
 Divorcee (2014) (with Anna Stewart, as Divorcee)
 Testarossa (2016)  (with Serengeti)

EPs
 Crazy Hitman Science (1999) (with Doseone, Jel, et al., as Blud N Gutz)
 Split EP! (2001) (as Why?, with Odd Nosdam)
 Miss Ohio's Nameless (2001) (with Odd Nosdam, Doug McDiarmid, Chris Messick & John Meinkin, as Miss Ohio's Nameless)
 The Peel Session (2001) (Clouddead)
 Early Whitney (2003) (as Why?)
 Sanddollars (2005) (with Why?)
 Rubber Traits EP (2006) (with Why?)
 Sod in the Seed (2012) (with Why?)

Mixtapes
 Old Dope (Rap Tape) (2014)
 Snowjams (Covers Tape) (2014)

Demo albums
 Alopecia: The Demos!! (2008) (with Why?)
 Eskimo Snow Demos (2009) (with Why?)
 Mumps, Etc. Etc.: The Demos 2007-2011 (2012) (with Why?)

Live albums
 Apogee (1997) (with Doseone, Josiah & Mr. Dibbs, as Apogee)
 Almost Live from Anna’s Cabin (2003) (as Why?)
 Hymie's Basement Live (2004) (Hymie's Basement)
 Almost Live from Eli's Room (2008) (with Why?)
 Live At Third Man Records (2018)

Singles
 "Attack of the Postmodern Pat Boones / Cannibalism of the Object Beings" (2000) (Object Beings)
 "Apt. A" (2000) (Clouddead)
 "And All You Can Do Is Laugh" (2000) (Clouddead)
 "I Promise Never to Get Paint on My Glasses Again" (2001) (Clouddead)
 "Jimmy Breeze" (2001) (Clouddead)
 "Cloud Dead Number Five" (2001) (Clouddead)
 "Bike" (2001) (Clouddead)
 "So Long, Mike Pt. 1 / Black Light District" (2001) (with Odd Nosdam, as MadToons Beat Orchestra)
 "The Sound of a Handshake / This About the City" (2002) (Clouddead)
 "Dead Dogs Two" (2004) (Clouddead)
 "Dumb Hummer" (2006) (with Why?)
 "The Hollows" (2007) (with Why?)

Guest appearances
 Sole - "Center City" from Bottle of Humans (2000)
 Reaching Quiet - "113th Clean" on Ropeladder 12 (2000)
 Hood - "They Removed All Trace That Anything Had Ever Happened Here", "Branches Bare" & "You're Worth The Whole World" from Cold House (2001)
 DJ Krush - "Song for John Walker" from The Message at the Depth (2002)
 Pedestrian - "O Hosanna" "Lifelong Liquidation Sale (1850-1950)" "The Dead Of A Day" "Anticon." "Jane 2: Electric Boogaloo" from Volume One: UnIndian Songs (2005)
 13 & God - "Soft Atlas" from 13 & God (2005)
 Jel - "All Day Breakfast" from Soft Money (2006)
 Subtle - "Falling" from Yell & Ice (2007)
 Xiu Xiu - "The Wig Master" from Remixed & Covered (2007)
 SJ Esau - "Note" from Stop Touching My Cat (2007)
 Alias - "Well Water Black" from Resurgam (2008)
 Cryptacize - "As I Went Out This Morning" from Unusual Animals Vol. 4 (2008)
 Telephone Jim Jesus - "Dice Raw" from Anywhere Out of the Everything (2008)
 Themselves - "Rapping 4 Money" from The Free Houdini (2009)
 Serengeti - "Geti Life" from C.A.R. (2012)
 Ceschi - "Yoni’s Electrocardiographs (feat. Yoni Wolf)" from Sans Soleil (2019)
 Foxing - "Speak With The Dead (feat. WHY?) (2021)

Remix credits
 Fog - "What a Day Day (Remix)" from What a Day Day (2003)
 Themselves - "Poison Pit (remix)" from The No Music of AIFFs (2003)
 13 & God - "Into The Trees (Remix)" from "Men of Station" (2005)
 Thee More Shallows - "Freshman Remix" from Monkey vs. Shark (2006)
 Bracken - "Heathens (Redone by Alias And Why?)" from "Heathens" (2006)

Discographies of American artists
Hip hop discographies
Music of the San Francisco Bay Area